Colonel Abdelkader Chabou Stadium ,is a multi-use stadium in Annaba, Algeria. It is currently used mostly for football matches and also sometimes for track cycling. It is the home ground of Hamra Annaba.  The stadium holds 10,000 spectators.

References

Chabou Abdelkader
Buildings and structures in Annaba